The 2006–07 season was the fourth season in the history of the Llanelli Scarlets rugby union team. They competed in the Celtic League, in which they finished in fourth place, as well as the Anglo-Welsh Cup and Heineken Cup. They won just one of their three Anglo-Welsh Cup matches and were knocked out in the pool stage, but despite being drawn in the same pool as Toulouse for a third year in a row, they won all six of their pool matches and qualified for the quarter-finals as the second seed, giving them a home tie against Munster. A 24–15 win at Stradey Park set up a semi-final away to Leicester Tigers, but although they led 17–16 early in the second half, they ended up losing 33–17.

Celtic League

Matches

Table

Anglo-Welsh Cup

Pool stage

Heineken Cup

Pool stage

Knockout stage

Notes

References

2006-07
Scarlets
Scarlets
Scarlets